Daniele Davin (born 7 July 1962) is a retired Italian football defender. With Torino he became runner-up in the 1981 Coppa Italia, playing both legs of the final.

References

1962 births
Living people
Italian footballers
Torino F.C. players
U.S. Pistoiese 1921 players
Parma Calcio 1913 players
Cagliari Calcio players
A.S. Gubbio 1910 players
Serie B players
Association football defenders